Sea-pie is a layered meat pie made with meat or fish, and is known to have been served to British sailors during the 18th century. Its popularity was passed on to the New England colonies sufficiently to be included in Amelia Simmons's landmark 1796 book American Cookery. Sea-pie is made by lining a saucepan or pot with a thick layer of pastry, and then filling the pot with alternating layers of meat (such as pork, beef, fish, or pigeon) or stew, and vegetables; and, topping the layered ingredients with pastry. There is no set list of ingredients; rather, sea-pie is made with whatever meat and vegetables are on-hand at the time it is made.

In Quebec this dish is called cipaille, cipâtes or six-pâtes (in French), and is a traditional Quebecois dish. It contains no fish or other seafood, but moose, partridge, hare, beef, veal, pork and chicken (or a simpler permutation of these). The French name most likely originated as an adaptation of sea-pie.

See also
 Canadian cuisine
 List of pies, tarts and flans
 Steak and oyster pie
 Tourtière

References

External links
 "Cipaille, or Sea Pie", Northwest Journal article
 “Sea pie: A saga of innovation and transformation” at British Food in America website

Cuisine of Quebec
Savoury pies